In a Balinese temple architecture,  a Bhoma is a carved or formed grotesque which decorates certain parts in the Balinese temple complex. The statue is similar to the Javanese Kala, and was intended to protect the temple complex from malevolent spirits.

Mythology

In Balinese mythology, Bhoma is the son of Dewa Wisnu and Dewi Pertiwi, the god of rain and the goddess of earth. One day, when Wisnu was digging the earth in the form of Varaha, his avatar in the form of a wild boar, he encountered a beautiful earth goddess named Dewi Pertiwi. The encounter leads to a union between Wisnu and Pertiwi, which produce a terrifying son named Bhoma.

The story of Wisnu as a wild boar digging up to the bottom of the earth to meet Pertiwi symbolizes torrents of stormy rainwater entering the earth. The figure of Bhoma that was produced by this union is seen as the growth of vegetation or forest (Vanaspati) as a result of the earth receiving the (rain) water. In Javanese and Balinese culture, Vanaspati is the king of the plant, not different with the European Green Man. The word Bhoma came from the Sanskrit word bhaumá, which means something that grows or is born from earth or something related to the earth.

Architecture

Bhoma is basically the Balinese kirtimukha. In Balinese temple architecture, Bhoma has the same function as the Javanese Kala which act as a guardian spirit of the temple complex. The head of Bhoma can be found carved at the temple gate which marks the entrance to the holiest part of the shrine (paduraksa) and at the base of the padmasana, the holiest and most central shrine in the Balinese temple.

The Padmasana is the holiest shrine in a Balinese temple complex. The padmasana is attributed to the Supreme God, the Sang Hyang Widhi Wasa). Like many religious constructions in Indonesia, the shrine padmasana is divided into three sections, from the base to the top, the bhur (world of demons), bhuwah (world of men), and swah (world of gods). The head figure of Bhoma normally added the base of the padmasana, together with other monstrous figures e.g. the Bedawang Nala, the world-supporting turtle, and the two snakes, Anantaboga, and Basuki, a symbol of man's earthly needs. In this context, the head of Bhoma at the base of the padmasana symbolizes the forest which surrounds the foot of a mountain (batur pepalihan).

In some Balinese houses, the doorway to some enclosed pavilion (e.g. the bale meten) is decorated with ornaments to form ventilation grill which is sometimes paneled. This is usually topped with a decorative frieze, which is sometimes carved in the form of the Bhoma's head.

The head of Bhoma is also seen in the Balinese cremation towers.

See also

Kirtimukha
Batara Kala

References

Cited works

 

Demons
Dragons
Folklore
Grotesques
Supernatural legends
Mythological monsters
Architectural history
Architecture in Indonesia
Balinese culture